Martin Liebers (born 22 June 1985 in Berlin) is a German former competitive figure skater. He is a four-time German national bronze medalist (2005–2008), was the Junior National Champion in 2000 and the Novice National Champion in 1997. 

In 2009 he started training pairs. He partnered with Nicole Gurny and they are being coached by Monika Scheibe. In the 2009–2010 season he intends to compete in both Singles and Pairs.

His father, Mario Liebers, competed internationally for East Germany from 1976 to 1980, and his younger brother, Peter Liebers, is the 2009 German National Champion.

Competitive highlights

Pairs career
(with Nicole Gurny)

Singles career

Post 2004

Pre 2004

 JGP = Junior Grand Prix

External links

 
 
 {http://www.paarlauf-fanclub.de/chemnitz.html}

1985 births
German male single skaters
German male pair skaters
Living people
Competitors at the 2009 Winter Universiade
20th-century German people
21st-century German people